USS Robin Hood was a  ship of 395 tons, purchased by the United States Navy in Mystic, Connecticut, during the American Civil War on 20 October 1861 for use in the "Stone Fleet." In December 1861 she was sunk as an obstruction in Charleston Harbor off Charleston, South Carolina.

See also

Union Blockade

References
 

Ships of the Stone Fleet
Ships of the Union Navy
Maritime incidents in December 1861
Scuttled vessels
Shipwrecks of the American Civil War
Shipwrecks of the Carolina coast